A Baña is a municipality in the province of A Coruña in the autonomous community of Galicia in northwestern Spain. It is 52 kilometers from the provincial capital of A Coruña. It has an area of 98.63 km², a population of 4,888 (2004 estimate), and a population density of 49.56 people/km²

Demographics

Vesía

Vesía is a town situated near the centre of the A Baña municipality, in the A Coruña province. It is part of the parish of San Vicente, the capital of the municipality. Vesía is at an altitude of 317.6 meters above sea level, and stands at an incline of 20.89%. Vesía has a population of around 40 people, the majority of whom are between 65 and 80 years old as the area has suffered youth emigration.

References 

Municipalities in the Province of A Coruña